Pietro Ubaldi (August 18, 1886 in Foligno, Italy – February 29, 1972 in São Vicente, Brazil) was an Italian author, teacher and philosopher. He was nominated for the Nobel Prize in Literature five times.

Biography

Ubaldi was graduated in Law and Music, at Rome. Fluent in English, French, German, Spanish and Portuguese, in addition to his native Italian, he also knew Latin and Greek language. A student of various philosophical and religious traditions, he distinguished himself as a Christian thinker. He had two children, Agnese and Franco, who died during the second world war. His Christian belief was not only an intellectual question, but a global dimension, something deeply connected with all his being. A descendant of one of the most renowned and ancient families of Umbria (the Italian region where Saint Francis of Assisi was born), he renounced richness to be faithful to the Gospel. So he was obliged to find a job to live. First he went to Sicily to teach English in a secondary school, then, always as a teacher, he went to Gubbio (Umbria), where he lived twenty years.

He authored 24 books: 12 in Italy and 12 in Brazil. Remarkable for anticipating by a few decades philosophical and scientific concepts later formalized by traditional sciences, including findings by Albert Einstein, The Great Synthesis, describing, among other themes, the unitary aspect of the universe and its consequences to spiritual evolution, is considered one of his principal works. He received the first inspiration for this book at the age of 27 years at Falconara (Marche). One day, on the seashore, he got the enlightenment that made him perceive the essence of the universe. He felt that matter, energy and spirit are different aspects of the same Substance and that their difference is a "kinetic difference", as he states, that is of movement: rotatory as regards matter, wave-like as regards energy, whirling as regards psyche.

List of books
Since most of Pietro Ubaldi's books are not available in English, titles are only a translation of their Italian versions and might vary once formally published.

1 – Messages
2 – The Great Synthesis (Synthesis and Solution to the Problems of Science and Spirit)
3 – The Nours (Techniques for Reception of Thought Currents)
4 – Mystic Ascension
5 – History of a Man
6 – Fragments of Thought and Passion
7 – The New Civilization of the Third Millenium
8 – Problems of the Future
9 – Human Ascension
10 – God and Universe
11 – Prophecies (The Future of the World)
12 – Comments
13 – Current Problems
14 – The System (Genesis and Structure of the Universe)
15 – The Great Battle
16 – Evolution and Gospel
17 – The Law of God
18 – The Functional Technique of God's Law
19 – Fall and Redemption
20 – Principles of a New Ethics
21 – The Downfall of the Ideals
22 – A Destiny Following Christ
23 – How to Orient One's Own Life
24 – Christ

References

External links
http://www.pietroubaldi.com/

Christian philosophers
1972 deaths
20th-century Italian philosophers
1886 births